My Life Is Hell is a 1991 French comedy film directed by Josiane Balasko.

Plot 
Leah Lemonnier (Josiane Balasko), 35, leads a dreary and depressing life between her work as the secretary of a dentist who spends his time reprimanding her, her analyst (Richard Berry) who sees in her only a source of income, her neighbor, Mr. Chpil, a sexually obsessed party animal (Jean Benguigui) and her mother (Catherine Samie), nymphomaniac, selfish, greedy, narcissistic and contemptuous. But one day, she unwittingly invokes the devil. He has the face of a handsome devil, Abar (Daniel Auteuil), who offers her a deal: He will be at her service until her death in exchange of her soul.

Leah signs the pact and turns into a dream creature to seduce her shrink. The pact is soon canceled by the intervention of the archangel Gabriel, who is moved by the naivety of the young woman. He tells Abar that he got the wrong prey, who was supposed to be Leah's mother. Gabriel cancels the agreement and takes all power away from Abar. But Leah begins to find Abargadon attractive and decides to save his soul. She pleads in his favor and the archangel accepts provided that Abar does not commit any sin for a period of several weeks.

Leah and Abar live in a seedy hotel. During a fire at the hotel, Abargadon saves a child but Leah is on the verge of death, poisoned by smoke. Abargadon decides to save her by giving her a blood transfusion. By this gesture, the archangel Gabriel decides to save his soul and makes him human.

A few months later, Leah, who has become demon, is at the head of a pharmaceutical company. She comes upon Abar robbing the business in order to steal patents. She offers a contract to Abar, now mortal, against his soul. Taking advantage of prior knowledge, he negotiates a favorable contract: a long life of carnal love between him and his love.

Cast 

Josiane Balasko - Leah Lemonnier
Daniel Auteuil - Abargadon
Richard Berry - Xavier Langsam
Michael Lonsdale - Gabriel
Catherine Samie - Flo Lemonnier
Jean Benguigui - Mr. Chpil
Luis Rego - Pazou
Catherine Hiegel - Lilith
Ticky Holgado - El Diablo
Bertrand Blier - The priest
Marilou Berry - The little girl
Alexandre Desplat - The pianist
Pierre Gérald - Dimitri
Joël Houssin - Gorilla archangel Gabriel
Bruno Moynot - The realtor

Parodies 
This film mocks:
 Insurance companies and their clauses written in small print;
 Psychoanalysis: The analyst writes his shopping list whilst his client tells him about her life; when she asks him to consider her financial situation, he explains that the amount of money is part of therapy; when his client takes revenge on him, Richard Berry sends up Freud’s terminology.

Release 
The film sold 1,170,523 tickets at the box office in France. In 1993, it was presented at the Adelaide Film Festival in Australia.

References

External links 

1991 comedy films
1991 films
French comedy films
Films about size change
Films directed by Josiane Balasko
2000s French films
1990s French films